The men's skeleton at the 2006 Winter Olympics took place on 17 February, at the Cesana Pariol.

Results
Canadians Duff Gibson and Jeffrey Pain won gold and silver despite Pain nearly losing control of his sled coming around the penultimate corner.  Switzerland's Gregor Stähli finished third, beating out Canadian Paul Boehm by only two tenths of a second to prevent a Canadian sweep of the podium. Gibson dedicated his medal to his father, Andy, who had died in December 2005 after an 11-year battle with cancer.

A picture of Gibson in action during this event would be used as a pictogram for the skeleton events at the following Winter Olympics.

References

Skeleton at the 2006 Winter Olympics
Men's events at the 2006 Winter Olympics